Nikolayevka is a rural locality (a selo) and the administrative center of Nikolayevskoye Rural Settlement, Veydelevsky District, Belgorod Oblast, Russia. The population was 1,000 as of 2010. There are 21 streets.

Geography 
Nikolayevka is located 30 km northeast of Veydelevka (the district's administrative centre) by road. Nogin is the nearest rural locality.

References 

Rural localities in Veydelevsky District